Alexis Alexandris (sometimes wrongly called Alekos Alexandris born 21 October 1968) is a Greek former professional footballer who played as a striker.

Club career
Alexandris began his career where he was born and raised, in Pelopas Kiato and in 1986 played for Veria. After Veroia he moved to AEK Athens in 1991 where he won 3 consecutive championships. In 1994 Alexandris moved to Olympiacos where he had a very successful career winning 7 Greek championships and 1 Greek cup. At the sunset of his career he was also both player and manager for APOP Kinyras during the team's first participation in the Cypriot First Division.

International career
Alexandris made 42 appearances and scored 10 goals for the Greece national football team, making his debut on 27 March 1991. He was a participant at the 1994 FIFA World Cup finals in the United States.

Managerial career
Alexis Alexandris starting his managing career on 12 February 2008 after taking over Kerkyra FC in Second Division (Greece). He left Kerkyra after a disagreement with the club's owner and from then moved to Olympiakos as the manager of the under21 squad.

Honours

AEK Athens
Alpha Ethniki: 1991–92, 1992–93, 1993–94

Olympiacos
Alpha Ethniki: 1996–97, 1997–98, 1998–99, 1999–2000, 2000–01, 2001–02, 2002–03
Greek Cup: 1998–99

Individual
Alpha Ethiniki top scorer: 1993–94, 1996–97, 2000–01, 2001–02
Greek Cup top scorer: 1996–97, 2000–01
Greek Footballer of the Year: 2001

References

External links
Tribute to Alexandris (Greek) ( ( 2009-10-25)

1968 births
Living people
People from Sikyona
Greek footballers
Expatriate football managers in Cyprus
Greek football managers
Greece international footballers
Greek expatriate footballers
Veria F.C. players
AEK Athens F.C. players
Olympiacos F.C. players
Athlitiki Enosi Larissa F.C. players
Kallithea F.C. players
APOP Kinyras FC players
1994 FIFA World Cup players
A.O. Kerkyra managers
Association football forwards
Greek expatriate sportspeople in Cyprus
Expatriate footballers in Cyprus
Super League Greece players
Cypriot First Division players
APOP Kinyras FC managers
Mediterranean Games gold medalists for Greece
Mediterranean Games medalists in football
Competitors at the 1991 Mediterranean Games
Footballers from the Peloponnese